Elsmere is a hamlet of the town of the Bethlehem in Albany County, New York, United States. The hamlet is a suburb of the neighboring city of Albany. From the northeast to the southwest, it is bisected by New York Route 443 (Delaware Avenue),  which is also the hamlet's main street and a major commuter route into Albany. Delaware Avenue is also home to most of the office and retail locations in Elsmere, including the largest such location: Delaware Plaza.

History
Elsmere is situated along Delaware Avenue (State Route 443), formerly known as Delaware Turnpike. Suburban residential growth began to displace the rural farmland starting in 1928 when the Delaware Avenue Bridge opened across the Normans Kill; the bridge connected Elsmere directly to Albany. Prior to this, commuters to Albany used narrow, winding roads through Normansville and a smaller lower bridge. The original center of the hamlet was the intersection of Elsmere Avenue and Delaware Avenue. By 1993, Delaware Avenue from the bridge over the Normans Kill to the abandoned railroad bridge marking Elsmere's unofficial border with Delmar had become heavily commercialized. Many of the businesses along Delaware Avenue occupied houses that had been converted to commercial use. Delaware Plaza, built in 1955, is the unofficial "center" of the hamlet of Elsmere.

Location

References

Bethlehem, New York
Hamlets in New York (state)
Hamlets in Albany County, New York